Neftalí O. Soto (born February 28, 1989) is a Puerto Rican professional baseball first baseman for the Yokohama DeNA BayStars of Nippon Professional Baseball (NPB). He has played in Major League Baseball (MLB) for the Cincinnati Reds.

He led the Central League with 41 home runs in the 2018 season, and with 43 in the 2019 season.

Early life
Soto was born in Manatí, Puerto Rico and attended Colegio Marista High School.

Professional career

Cincinnati Reds
The Reds drafted Soto with a supplemental third-round pick in the 2007 Major League Baseball Draft. He played the rest of the 2007 season with the Gulf Coast League Reds rookie-class team, hitting .303 with two homers and 28 RBI.

Soto started 2008 with the rookie-class Billings Mustangs, where he hit .388 in 67 at-bats, belting four homers with 11 RBI. His performance earned him a promotion to low-A Dayton. In 218 at-bats for the Dragons, he hit .326 with seven homers and 36 RBI.

Soto was promoted again for 2009, this time to the advanced-A Sarasota Reds. He played a full season at Sarasota, getting 505 at-bats and hitting .248 with 11 homers and 57 RBI. The Reds advanced-A team moved to Lynchburg for 2010, where Soto played for the 2010 season. In 522 at-bats he hit .268 with 21 homers and 73 RBI.

In 2011, Soto played for the double-A Carolina Mudcats. He played in 102 games (379 at-bats), hitting .272 with an impressive 30 homers and 76 RBI. After the double-A season, he played in four games for triple-A Louisville, going 7-for-17 with another home run and four more RBI. His season slugging percentage was .576. Soto was named Southern League player of the week twice during the season for Carolina.

Entering his fifth year of eligibility (which would make him eligible for the Rule 5 Draft), the Reds placed him on the 40-man roster following the 2011 season.

Soto was called up to the Major Leagues for the first time on May 18, 2013. In 13 games with the Reds, he batted 0-for-12.

In 2014, he began the season on the Reds' big-league roster, and tallied his first career RBI on April 7 against the St. Louis Cardinals with a sacrifice fly off Trevor Rosenthal to drive in Ryan Ludwick. On April 14 he got his first big-league hit, a fifth-inning double off the Pittsburgh Pirates' Wandy Rodriguez.

Soto was outrighted off the Reds roster on October 28, 2014.

Chicago White Sox
On March 23, 2015, Soto was traded to the Chicago White Sox for cash considerations. He spent the year with the Triple-A Charlotte Knights and elected free agency after the season.

Washington Nationals
On February 8, 2016, Soto signed a minor league deal with the Washington Nationals. After splitting time between the Double-A Harrisburg Senators and the Triple-A Syracuse Chiefs in 2016 and putting up a combined .274/.318/.408 slash line with 10 home runs, Soto was invited to major league spring training as a non-roster player in 2017. Soto was not selected to the Nationals roster, but he went on to have a much stronger season with Harrisburg and then Syracuse, with a .311/.364/.528 slash line and 24 home runs across both levels. On November 6, 2017, he elected free agency.

Yokohama DeNA BayStars
On November 10, 2017, Soto signed with the Yokohama DeNA BayStars of Nippon Professional Baseball(NPB).

In 2018 season, Soto finished the 2018 season with a .310 batting average, 129 hits, 95 RBIs, a .364 on-base percentage, a .644 slugging percentage, and 1.008 on-base plus slugging. He led the Central League with 41 home runs.

On November 18, 2019, Soto signed a 1-year extension to remain with the BayStars.

On September 19, 2020, Soto hit his 100th home run in Japan in a 7-1 win. He is the 81st imported player to reach the 100-home run milestone in Japan.

References

External links

Neftali Soto Stats, Bio on MiLB.com

1989 births
Living people
Billings Mustangs players
Cangrejeros de Santurce (baseball) players
Carolina Mudcats players
Charlotte Knights players
Cincinnati Reds players
Criollos de Caguas players
Dayton Dragons players
Gulf Coast Reds players
Harrisburg Senators players
Leones de Ponce players
Liga de Béisbol Profesional Roberto Clemente infielders
Louisville Bats players
Lynchburg Hillcats players
Major League Baseball first basemen
Major League Baseball players from Puerto Rico
Nippon Professional Baseball infielders
People from Manatí, Puerto Rico
Puerto Rican expatriate baseball players in Japan
Sarasota Reds players
Syracuse Chiefs players
Yokohama DeNA BayStars players
2023 World Baseball Classic players